Villarreal Club de Fútbol, S.A.D., usually abbreviated to Villarreal CF or simply Villarreal, is a professional football club based in Villarreal, in the Castellón province of eastern Spain, that plays in La Liga, the top flight of Spanish football.

Founded in 1923, the club spent much time of its history in the lower divisions of Spanish football and began in La Liga in 1998. In the 21st century, Villarreal gained some league stability, although they sustained relegation in 2012, rebounding the next year and then remaining in the top division to date. The club made its first appearance in the UEFA Champions League in 2005, with its best result being the semi-finals in 2006 and 2022. Villarreal also appeared in the UEFA Europa League during this time, and won the competition in 2021 by defeating Manchester United in the final, clinching their first major trophy.

The club is nicknamed El Submarí Groguet or El Submarino Amarillo (Yellow Submarine) due to its yellow home kit, and due to being a low-profile team compared to Real Madrid, Barcelona, Atlético Madrid, and regional rivals Valencia. They play their home games at the Estadio de la Cerámica, and have been touted as an example of a small but successful club.

History

1923–29: Early years
Villarreal CF was founded as Club Deportivo Villarreal on 10 March 1923 "to promote all sports especially Football." The stadium was rented for 60 pesetas a month and ticket prices were set at half a peseta for men and a quarter of a peseta for children. Women were granted free admission. On 17 June 1923, Castellón, a modern rival of the club, played the first match against a club named after Miguel de Cervantes. On 21 October of that year, Villarreal played their first game ever, playing against Castellón. Villarreal started off with a kit of white shirts and black shorts, reflected in their first badge.

1929–98: Time in lower divisions
Villarreal entered regional competitions within the Spanish football pyramid from 1929 to 1930 onwards. The 1934–35 season saw the team lose to Cartagena when a win would have seen them promoted to the nationwide Second Division. The following season saw Villarreal win the First Division of the region before the outbreak of the Spanish Civil War.

When the war finished in 1939, the club played again in the Second Division of the region. However, CD Villarreal was dissolved in the early 1940s, and in 1942, CA Foghetecaz, an acronym for the club's founders (Font, Gil, Herrero, Teuler, Catalá and Zaragoza), was one of several clubs established in its place. In 1946, the new club joined the Valencian Football Federation and renamed itself as CAF Villarreal, where the F stood for Foghetecaz.

The name changed again to the current Villarreal CF in 1954, with a badge similar to the present one. They finished seventh and then fourth twice in the First regional league before being promoted to the Tercera Liga (Third Nationwide) as champions in 1956. They were relegated in 1960–61 after finishing 14th.

The club adopted their present badge in the middle of 1966. In 1966–67, Villarreal returned to the Tercera as champions. In 1970, they reached the national Segunda for the first time. After narrowly avoiding relegation in their first season, they were relegated the following season. In 1975–76, they were relegated from the Tercera to the Regionals, but were promoted back again the next season. In 1986–87, Villarreal were promoted to the Segunda Liga B. In 1990, they finished 18th and were relegated back to the Tercera.

There were back-to-back promotions as the club returned to Segunda B and finished second, earning promotion to Segunda A for the first time. From 1992 to 1993, Villarreal were often in low or mid-table positions, but reached the play-offs in 1997–98 by finishing fourth. The two-legged play-off was against Compostela. Villarreal hosted the first leg which was a 0–0 draw, but the second leg at the home of the Galician team was a 1–1 draw, thus Villarreal were promoted on the away goals rule.

1998–2012: La Liga and European debuts
Villarreal's La Liga debut started with a match against reigning European champions Real Madrid at the Santiago Bernabéu Stadium on 31 August 1998 where they lost 4-1 despite taking the lead after 3 minutes. The first home game was against Celta de Vigo the week after. Because of a difficult season, Villarreal were relegated to the Segunda División for the 1999–2000 season, but by finishing third, they were then promoted back to the Primera División.

After finishing seventh on their return to the Primera, Villarreal finished in 15th place for two-straight seasons. Villarreal competed in the UEFA Intertoto Cup in the middle of 2002, defeating FH of Iceland, Torino of Italy, and Troyes of France. They lost in the final to compatriots Málaga, 2–1 on aggregate.

In the middle of 2003, they defeated the Dutch team Heerenveen in the final of the Intertoto Cup, thereby qualifying for the UEFA Cup. In their major European debut, Villarreal reached the semi-finals of the UEFA Cup, losing to neighbours and eventual champions Valencia. In the league, Villarreal finished in eighth place. In the middle of 2004, Villarreal retained the Intertoto Cup, beating compatriots Atlético Madrid on penalties after the final finished 2–2 on aggregate. This qualified them to the UEFA Cup. They lost in the quarter-finals of the 2004–05 UEFA Cup to Dutch side AZ, losing 3–2 on aggregate. During the same season, Villarreal finished in third place in La Liga, earning the club their first direct qualification to a European tournament, the Champions League. The club's centre-forward Diego Forlán won the Pichichi Trophy for top scorer in the league, with 25 goals.

Villarreal defeated the English Premier League's Everton in a play-off for the Champions League group stages. The group saw Villarreal go undefeated, drawing both games against Manchester United and achieving a draw and a win each against Lille of France and Benfica of Portugal. The win over Benfica was away and both teams advanced to the last 16.

The club then drew 3–3 against Rangers of Scotland in the Last 16, advancing on away goals due to a 2–2 draw at Ibrox. In the quarter-finals, Villarreal beat Internazionale on away goals after finishing 2–2 on aggregate. The club bowed out in the semi-finals against Arsenal, losing 1–0 away at Highbury. Juan Román Riquelme had a penalty saved by Jens Lehmann in the home game, which finished 0–0. Arsenal went on to lose in the final in Paris to another Spanish club, Barcelona. Villarreal finished seventh in La Liga, which only earned an Intertoto Cup position.

Villarreal contested the Intertoto Cup in the middle of 2006 and was knocked out in its first game, to Maribor of Slovenia. The first leg was lost 2–1 at home and the away game was a 1–1 draw. The team finished 5th in La Liga and qualified for the UEFA Cup. Villarreal gained their best-ever league position in 2008, finishing second to Real Madrid by eight points, and also reached the last 32 in that season's UEFA Cup. After defeating BATE Borisov of Belarus in a play-off, the team won Group C unbeaten. Their group opponents were Fiorentina of Italy, Mladá Boleslav of Czech Republic, IF Elfsborg of Sweden, and AEK Athens of Greece.

In the last 32, Villarreal were defeated by eventual champions Zenit Saint Petersburg, losing the first leg 1–0 in Russia to a Pavel Pogrebnyak goal. The second leg was won 2–1 by Villarreal at El Madrigal, but Zenit advanced on away goals.

The club automatically qualified for the 2008–09 UEFA Champions League by finishing second in La Liga the previous season. They drew Manchester United, for the second consecutive campaign, Celtic, and Aalborg BK. They made a good start by holding current European champions Manchester United to a goal-less draw at Old Trafford, a third 0–0 draw in a row against the English giants. A first win was sealed on 30 September by beating Gordon Strachan's Celtic 1–0 at El Madrigal, courtesy of a Marcos Senna free-kick. On 21 October, during a Champions League match against Aalborg, they scored six goals to three. The Spaniards went through to the knock-out stage after drawing 2–2 with Aalborg in Denmark and drawing goalless once again against Manchester United. In the last group stage match, they lost to an already-eliminated Celtic.

In the knock-out stage, they faced Panathinaikos, who left Villarreal with a 1–1 away advantage, but lost 1–2 in Athens. Villarreal reached the quarter-finals for the second time in two attempts, and were once again paired with Arsenal. The first leg saw a 1–1 draw by a Marcos Senna free kick, equalised by an Emmanuel Adebayor volley. Theo Walcott, Emmanuel Adebayor, and Robin van Persie secured a 3–0 win for Arsenal on the return, knocking Villarreal out of the tournament.

Despite finishing outside of a European qualifying spot in the domestic league, Villarreal was given a place in the qualifying round of the 2010–11 UEFA Europa League after UEFA determined that Mallorca's financial irregularities precluded them from taking part in the tournament.

A 5–0 home win and a 2–1 away win against Dnepr Mogilev qualified them for the group stage. Villarreal suffered an early setback following a shock 2–0 loss in their away fixture against Dinamo Zagreb. Despite this, however, later wins against Dinamo, Club Brugge and PAOK saw them top their group.

After beating Napoli, Bayer Leverkusen and Twente in the knockout phases, Villarreal qualified for the semi-finals to face tournament favourites Porto. After Villareal took a 0–1 lead at the Estádio do Dragão, Porto made a remarkable turnaround that ended in a 5–1 defeat for Villarreal. Although Villarreal won the second leg 3–2, Porto's first leg goal total saw them advance to the final on aggregate, where they beat Braga to be crowned champions. Giuseppe Rossi finished as the tournament's second top goalscorer with 11 goals, behind Porto's Radamel Falcao.

2012–present: Relegation and European glory

On 13 May 2012, Villarreal were relegated from La Liga after defeat to Atlético Madrid. Following a horrendous season, the club suffered a shattering tragedy when Manolo Preciado, appointed as Villarreal's new manager on 6 June 2012, died of a heart attack later that day. Following their relegation, there was a mass exodus of players at the club, with star players such as Borja Valero, Diego López, Giuseppe Rossi and Nilmar leaving the side.

After one year in the Segunda División, Villarreal were promoted back to La Liga on the final day of the season after finishing the year second after champions Elche. The team began its new tenure in the top flight by winning its first three games; the winning streak ended with a tie against Real Madrid at El Madrigal, though the team was undefeated until falling to Real Betis 1–0 on the seventh matchday of the season. The Yellow Submarine finished the 2013–14 campaign in sixth, thus qualifying them for next season's Europa League.

In 2014–15, Villarreal again finished the year in sixth, enough to secure direct qualification to the Europa League group stage. In the 2015–16 season, Villarreal led La Liga for the first time during the sixth and seventh weeks, before falling to fifth place the following week. The club ended the season in 4th place and thus advanced to the 2016–17 UEFA Champions League playoff round. The club progressed to the semi-finals of the 2015–16 Europa League, but were knocked out by Liverpool. Villarreal won the first leg 1–0, but lost 3–0 in Liverpool and 3–1 on aggregate.

In 2019–20, Villarreal finished fifth, earning a place in the 2020–21 UEFA Europa League. The team went on a memorable run, advancing to the final after knocking out Arsenal 2–1 on aggregate. Facing favoured Manchester United, Villarreal held them to a 1–1 draw after extra time and then won 11–10 in a penalty shoot-out, winning the club's first ever major trophy. Courtesy of their triumph, Villarreal switched their next year's participation in the inaugural 2021–22 Europa Conference League to the 2021–22 Champions League.

In the 2021–22 season, Villarreal progressed to the semi-finals of the Champions League after knocking out Juventus in the round of 16 and Bayern Munich in the quarter-finals, before losing 5–2 on aggregate to Liverpool.

Rivalries
Villarreal has supported a long rivalry with Castellón for geographical reasons, since both are from the province of Castellón. They also rival Valencia, since the two had been the most competitive teams of the Valencian Community; this clash is called the "Derbi de la Comunitat."

Records
 Villarreal's biggest league win at home was by a five-goal margin, achieved on four occasions. The club recorded 5–0 home victories against Salamanca (1998–99 La Liga), Celta Vigo (2002–03 and 2016–17 La Liga), and Tenerife (2009–10 La Liga). The most goals Villarreal scored in a league game was six, in a 6–3 home win against Racing Santander during the 2003–04 La Liga season.
 The club's largest away league wins were a 5–1 victory at Las Palmas during the 2000–01 La Liga season, a 4–0 victory at Real Sociedad in the same division during the 2004–05 season, and 4–0 and 5–1 victories at Celta Vigo and Levante, respectively, both during the 2020–21 La Liga season.
 The club's first major trophy was won in 2021 with a penalty shoot-out victory over Manchester United in the Europa League final.

Club colours

The club's famous yellow kit dates back to 1947. With the new season fast approaching, the son of the then Villarreal president travelled to Valencia to purchase replacements of the club's official kit of white shirts and black shorts. Discovering that the shop had neither in stock, he instead bought the only color that they did have, which happened to be yellow. The players agreed that the shirts were suitable, although they weren't keen on the black shorts, so the president's son travelled to Castellón and purchased a batch of white shorts. The players voted that they should be dyed blue. After remaining as the club's official kit for some time, the yellow shirts and blue shorts combination was last worn in the 2002–03 season, and the club has since sported all-yellow kits. Away colours have been navy blue.

From 2005 to 30 June 2011, the shirt sponsor was "Aeroport Castello", an airport. The current shirt sponsor is Pamesa, a ceramics company. From the 2016–17 season, the kit has been made by the Spanish company Joma, having previously been produced by the Chinese company Xtep and Puma of Germany, among others.

Honours

Domestic
 Tercera División
 Winners: 1969–70

European
 UEFA Europa League
 Winners: 2020–21
 UEFA Intertoto Cup
 Winners: 2003, 2004

Season to season

 23 seasons in La Liga
 10 seasons in Segunda División
 4 seasons in Segunda División B
 23 seasons in Tercera División

In Europe

Accurate as of 25 August 2022

UEFA club coefficient ranking

Nickname and mascot
The team is nicknamed El Submarino Amarillo (the Yellow Submarine) because of their yellow strip. The mascot (named Groguet, "Little Yellow") is characterised as an anthropomorphic submarine. He made his debut on 26 October 2001 and was named on 13 December that year by a local 12-year-old, Javier Fuster Almela, following a province-wide competition open to under-15s.

Players

Current squad
.

Reserve team

Out on loan

Player records

Most Appearances
Competitive, professional matches only. Bold indicates player is still active at club level.
As of 20 February 2023.

Goalscorers
Competitive, professional matches only. Appearances, including substitutes, are shown in parentheses.
As of 21 February 2023.

<div id="1">1 Includes matches and goals from La Liga, Segunda División and Segunda División B.
<div id="2">2 Includes matches and goals from UEFA Champions League, UEFA Europa League, UEFA Conference League, UEFA Intertoto Cup and UEFA Super Cup.
<div id="a">a Includes 2 goals from 1992 Segunda División B play-offs.

Current technical staff

|-
|Manager || Quique Setién
|-
|Second Manager || Pablo Villanueva
|-
|Goalkeeping Coach || Javi García
|-
|Fitness Coach || Mario Segarra   Moisés de Hoyo
|-
|Technical Assistant || Pablo Rodríguez   Antonio Rodríguez   Jaime Arias
|-
|Analyst || Víctor Mañas   Carlos Mulet
|-
|Delegate ||  Xisco Nadal
|-
|Director of Medical Services ||  Héctor Usó
|-
|Medical Services ||  Simón Bueno
|-
|Nurse ||  Sergio Broceño
|-
|Physiotherapist ||  Nacho Fornás   Josep Rochera   Igor de Fuentes   Axel Tirado   Omar Marín
|-
|Rehab fitness coach || Ángel Torres   Jordi Vives
|-
|Massage therapist || Juan Hernández
|-
|Field delegate || Luis Jiménez
|-
|Equipment Manager || Jorge Garrido   Adrián Ortells
|-

Coaches

  Josep Seguer (1978–1980)
  José Manuel Pesudo (1985–1986)
  Julio Raúl (1990–1991)
  López Sanjuán (1990–1992)
  Carlos Simón Server (1991–1992)
  Fidel Uriarte (1995)
  David Vidal (1995–1996)
  Javier Subirats (1996–1997)
  José Antonio Irulegui (1996–1999)
  Joaquín Caparrós (1 July 1999 – 4 October 1999)
  Paquito (1999–2000)
  Víctor Muñoz (1 July 2000 – 30 June 2003)
  Benito Floro (1 July 2003 – 24 February 2004)
  Manuel Pellegrini (7 July 2004 – 30 June 2009)
  Ernesto Valverde (1 July 2009 – 31 January 2010)
  Juan Carlos Garrido (31 January 2010 – 21 December 2011)
  José Francisco Molina (22 December 2011 – 18 March 2012)
  Miguel Ángel Lotina (19 March 2012 – 30 June 2012)
  Julio Velázquez (1 July 2012 – 13 January 2013)
  Marcelino (14 January 2013 – 10 August 2016)
  Fran Escribá (18 August 2016 – 25 September 2017)
  Javier Calleja (25 September 2017 – 10 December 2018)
  Luis García (10 December 2018 – 29 January 2019)
  Javier Calleja (29 January 2019 – 20 July 2020)
  Unai Emery (23 July 2020 – 24 October 2022)

Women's football

See also
 Villarreal CF B – Second team currently in the Segunda División A
 Villarreal CF C – Third team currently in the Tercera División, Group 6
 :Category:Villarreal CF footballers

References

External links

  
 Villarreal CF at La Liga 
 Villarreal CF at UEFA 

 
La Liga clubs
Football clubs in the Valencian Community
Association football clubs established in 1923
1923 establishments in Spain
Segunda División clubs
UEFA Europa League winning clubs
UEFA Intertoto Cup winning clubs